Newton Smith Fielding (1799–1856), was an English painter and lithographer.

Life
Fielding was born in London in 1799, the youngest son of Nathan Theodore Fielding. He exhibited at the Society of Painters in Water-colours, showing some landscapes in 1815, and cattle pieces in 1818. He is best known for his paintings and engravings of animals. Besides painting in water-colours, he also made etchings, aquatints, and lithographs, becoming especially proficient in the last of these. He moved to Paris where he lived until his death, on 12 January 1856; he was much esteemed there, entering the 1827 Paris Salon and teaching the family of Louis-Philippe. In 1836 he published in London a set of Subjects after Nature, and in Paris he published sets of lithographs of animals, and illustrations to various works.

He also published Three Hundred Lessons; or, a Year's Instruction in Landscape Drawing, including Marine Subjects, with Hints on Perspective, (1852); Lessons on Fortification, with Plates, (1853); A Dictionary of Colour, containing Seven Hundred and Fifty Tints, to which is prefixed a Grammar of Colour, (1854); What to Sketch with; or, Hints on the Use of Coloured Crayons, Water-colours, Oil-colours, Black and White Chalks, Black-lead Pencil, and the Author's new Method of Preserving the Lights with Composition, (1856); and How to Sketch from Nature; or, Perspective and its Application, (2nd edit. 1856).

References

1799 births
1856 deaths
19th-century British educators
English lithographers
19th-century English painters
English male painters
Painters from London
Art writers
English non-fiction writers
19th-century English non-fiction writers
English male non-fiction writers
19th-century English male writers
19th-century English male artists